Denisa Dvořáková (born 28 May 1989) is a Czech model, who is best known as the winner of the Elite Model Look 2006.

Early life 
Denisa was born in Prague, Czech Republic.

Career 
Dvořáková's career started when she attended a scouting for new models in Prague in 2005. She signed a contract with the Czech branch of the Elite Models agency, and within a few months she was walking for Prada in Milan, and Dior, Chanel and Chloé in Paris.

Dvořáková entered and was crowned the winner of the Elite Model Look competition in 2006, aged 16. She has been on the cover of Vogue Italia and Dazed & Confused, and has walked the runway for designers including Versace, Chanel, Karl Lagerfeld, Fendi, Christian Dior, John Galliano, and Valentino.

References

External links 
 
 
 Denisa Dvorakova at The Internet Fashion Database

1989 births
Living people
Czech female models
Models from Prague